Alexandra School may refer to:

Australia 
 Alexandra Hills State High School, Alexandra Hills, Queensland

Azerbaijan 
 Empress Alexandra Russian Muslim Boarding School for Girls, Baku

Barbados 
 The Alexandra School, Speighstown, St.Peter

Canada 
 Queen Alexandra Elementary School, Vancouver, British Columbia
 Queen Alexandra Elementary School, Queen Alexandra, Edmonton, Alberta
 Princess Alexandra School, Riversdale, Saskatoon, Saskatchewan
 Alexandra Junior High School (formerly Alexandra High School), Medicine Hat, Alberta
 Princess Alexandra Middle School, Hay River, Northwest Territories
 Alexandra School, a former school in the list of Waterloo Region, Ontario schools

Republic of Ireland 
 Alexandra College, Milltown, Dublin

New Zealand 
 Alexandra Primary School, Alexandra, New Zealand

South Africa 
 Alexandra High School, Pietermaritzburg, KwaZulu-Natal

United Kingdom 
 Alexandra High School, one of the predecessors of The ACE Academy, Tipton, West Midlands
 Alexandra Park School, Haringey, North London
 Alexandra Park School (merged), Haringey, North London merged in 1983 with Creighton School
 The Royal Alexandra and Albert School, Reigate, Surrey
 Alexandra Park Infants and Junior Schools, Edgeley, Stockport, Greater Manchester
 Alexandra School (originally in Watford), one of the predecessors of Queens' School, Bushey, Hertfordshire
 Alexandra Road School, one of the predecessors of Penglais School, Aberystwyth, Ceredigion, West Wales